William Coape Oates (7 July 1862 – 20 February 1942) was an English first-class cricketer active 1881–95 who played for Nottinghamshire. He was born in Nottinghamshire; died in Lincoln.

He was educated at Harrow School where he played for the XI.

References

1862 births
1942 deaths
English cricketers
Nottinghamshire cricketers
Marylebone Cricket Club cricketers
People educated at Harrow School